Monkstown is a townland (of 811 acres) and electoral ward in County Antrim, Northern Ireland. It is within the urban area of Newtownabbey and the Antrim and Newtownabbey Borough Council area. The townland was previously called Ballynamanagh It is also situated in the civil parish of Carnmoney and the historic barony of Belfast Lower.

Monkstown is said to be the burial place of Fergus Mor Mac Eirc, king of Dal Riata. which suggests a religious house was established in the 5th century CE. It possibly became a grange- a farm that was managed by a monastery, and was possibly associated with the monastery at Woodburn in Carrickfergus.

Railways
Monkstown railway station is currently closed on the Belfast-Derry railway line run by Northern Ireland Railways.

Education
Schools and colleges which serve the area include Abbey Community College, Hollybank Primary School and University of Ulster.

Sport
The local association football clubs, 18th Newtownabbey Old Boys F.C. and Nortel F.C., play in the Northern Amateur Football League.

References

Wards of Northern Ireland
Townlands of County Antrim
Civil parish of Carnmoney